The women's long jump event at the 1986 World Junior Championships in Athletics was held in Athens, Greece, at Olympic Stadium on 18 and 19 July.

Medalists

Results

Final
19 July

Qualifications
18 Jul

Group A

Group B

Participation
According to an unofficial count, 27 athletes from 23 countries participated in the event.

References

Long jump
Long jump at the World Athletics U20 Championships